Hinderaker is a surname. Notable people with the surname include:

Eric Hinderaker (born 1959), American historian 
Ivan Hinderaker (1916–2007), American educator and academic administrator
John C. Hinderaker (born 1968), American judge